Epichorista zatrophana is a species of moth of the family Tortricidae. It is found in New Zealand.

The wingspan is 11–12 mm. The forewings are bright ochreous, spotted with whitish. The markings are deep reddish ochreous, somewhat mixed with blackish. The hindwings are dark fuscous.

References

Moths described in 1883
Epichorista
Moths of New Zealand